Mr Boo may refer to:
 Majin Buu a character from the Dragon Ball manga series created by Akira Toriyama
 Mr Boo, a character from 1970s British children's TV series Jamie and the Magic Torch
 Mr Boo, stagename of English circus clown Tom Endresz, brother and comic partner of Laci Endrecz Jr aka Mooky the Clown, chief clown at Blackpool Tower Circus.
 Mr Boo, lead character of Mr. Boo Meets Pom Pom, 1985 Hong Kong comedy film